Centrolepis is a genus of small herbaceous plants in the family Restionaceae known as thorn grass scales, with about 25 species native to Australia, New Zealand, New Guinea, and south-east Asia as far north as Hainan Dao. APG III system classifies this genus in the Centrolepidaceae family.

Centrolepis species are all tufted plants with narrow leaves from the base.  Flowers are tiny and wind-pollinated, in highly condensed inflorescences enclosed between a pair of bracts that often have leaf-like points.

 Species
 Centrolepis alepyroides (Nees) Walp. - Avon + Darling in Western Australia 
 Centrolepis aristata (R.Br.) Roem. & Schult. - Western Australia, South Australia, Tasmania, Victoria, New South Wales
 Centrolepis banksii (R.Br.) Roem. & Schult. - Western Australia, Northern Territory, Queensland, Hainan, Thailand, Vietnam, Cambodia
 Centrolepis caespitosa D.A.Cooke - Western Australia
 Centrolepis cambodiana Hance - Laos, Vietnam, Cambodia
 Centrolepis cephaloformis Reader - Western Australia, South Australia, Victoria
 Centrolepis ciliata (Hook.f.) Druce - New Zealand (North & South Is., Auckland Islands, Campbell Island)
 Centrolepis curta D.A.Cooke - Western Australia
 Centrolepis drummondiana (Nees) Walp - Western Australia, possibly South Australia
 Centrolepis eremica D.A.Cooke - Western Australia, South Australia, New South Wales, Northern Territory
 Centrolepis exserta (R.Br.) Roem. & Schult. - Western Australia, Northern Territory, Queensland
 Centrolepis fascicularis Labill.  - Australia (all 6 states but not NT), New Guinea, Sumatra, New Zealand (recorded once)
 Centrolepis glabra (F.Muell. ex Sond.) Hieron. - New Zealand South Island, Western Australia, South Australia, Tasmania, Victoria, New South Wales
 Centrolepis humillima F.Muell. ex Benth. - Western Australia
 Centrolepis inconspicua W.Fitzg. - Avon + Darling in Western Australia
 Centrolepis milleri M.D.Barrett & D.D.Sokoloff - Western Australia
 Centrolepis monogyna (Hook.f.) Benth. - Tasmania
 Centrolepis muscoides (Hook.f.) Hieron. - Tasmania
 Centrolepis mutica (R.Br.) Hieron. - Darling in Western Australia 
 Centrolepis pallida (Hook.f.) Cheeseman - New Zealand (North & South Islands, Auckland Islands, Campbell Island)
 Centrolepis pedderensis W.M.Curtis - Tasmania
 Centrolepis philippinensis Merr. - Borneo, Philippines, Sulawesi, New Guinea
 Centrolepis pilosa Hieron. - Western Australia
 Centrolepis polygyna (R.Br.) Hieron. - Western Australia, South Australia, Tasmania, Victoria, New South Wales
 Centrolepis racemosa D.D.Sokoloff & Remizowa - Northern Territory
 Centrolepis strigosa (R.Br.) Roem. & Schult. - Australia (all 6 states but not NT), New Zealand;

References

 
Poales genera
Restionaceae